Benaam is a Pakistani television family soap series aired on ARY Digital from 2 November 2021 to 2 January 2022. It is produced by Humayun Saeed and Shahzad Nasib under Six Sigma Plus. It stars Komal Meer, Noor Hassan Rizvi, Anoushay Abbasi, Shazeal Shoukat, Babar Ali, Nadia Hussain, Imran Aslam and Saad Qureshi in lead roles. The story revolves around the ill treatment and hardships faced by twin sisters Aiza and Aimal, who lives with their step-father despite having a real father, who left them before they were born.

Cast
Noor Hassan Rizvi as Haider; husband of Aiza and brother in law to Aimal
Anoushay Abbasi as Aimal; Umar Second Wife
Komal Meer as Aiza; Wife of Haider
Saad Qureshi as Umar; Tooba and Aimal husband 
Shazeal Shoukat as Laiba
Babar Ali as Taimoor; father of Aimal, Aiza and Laiba
Nadia Hussain as Rabia; wife of Taimoor mother to Laiba and stepmother to Aimal and Aiza
Imran Aslam as Babar 
Humaira Bano as Haider's mother
Shazia Gohar as Umar's mother
Ghana Ali as Umar's elder sister
Anam Tanveer as Umar's elder sister
Minna Tariq as Tooba; wife of Umar
Fawad Jalal as Umar's brother-in-law
Sara Malik as Bajo (Umar and Tooba eldest sister 
Zeeshan Khan
Shariq Hussain
Waseem Abbas as Aimal and Aiza's adoptive father (Guest appearance)

Reception
The drama received a TRP rating as high as 10.9 in its time slot.

Lux Style Awards

References

ARY Digital original programming
2021 Pakistani television series debuts
2022 Pakistani television series endings